Stephen Goodin (born August 25, 1988) is an American football offensive guard who is a free agent. He played college football at the University of Nebraska at Kearney and attended Hastings Senior High School in Hastings, Nebraska. He has also been a member of the New York Giants, Dallas Cowboys and Minnesota Vikings of the National Football League.

Early years
Goodin played high school football for the Hastings Senior High School Tigers, earning All-state honors as a tight end.

College career
Goodin played for the Nebraska-Kearney Lopers from 2007 to 2011. He was redshirted in 2006 and medically redshirted in 2010. He earned honorable mention Academic All-Rocky Mountain Athletic Conference honors in 2007 and first-team Academic All-RMAC recognition in 2008. Goodin also garnered second-team All-RMAC, second-team Academic All-District and first-team Academic All-RMAC accolades in 2009. He earned first-team All-RMAC recognition and was team co-caption in 2011.

Professional career

New York Giants
Goodin signed with the New York Giants on May 11, 2012 after going undrafted in the 2012 NFL Draft. He was released by the Giants on August 31, 2012. He was signed to the Giants practice squad on November 21, 2012. Goodin was released by the Giants on August 31, 2013 and signed to the Giants' practice squad on September 1, 2013. He was promoted to the active roster on November 26, 2013. He made his NFL debut on December 29, 2013 against the Washington Redskins. He was released by the Giants on May 29, 2014.

Dallas Cowboys
Goodin was signed by the Dallas Cowboys on August 12, 2014. He was released by the Cowboys on August 30, 2014.

Minnesota Vikings
Goodin signed with the Minnesota Vikings on August 18, 2015. He was released by the Vikings on August 30, 2015.

Brooklyn Bolts
Goodin was signed by the Brooklyn Bolts of the Fall Experimental Football League (FXFL) in 2015.

References

External links
Just Sports Stats

Living people
1988 births
American football offensive guards
Nebraska–Kearney Lopers football players
New York Giants players
Brooklyn Bolts players
Players of American football from Nebraska
People from Hastings, Nebraska
Hastings Senior High School (Nebraska) alumni